Chandra Fernando is a former Sri Lankan police officer and was the 29th Inspector-General of Police.

Fernando was educated at St Peter's College, Colombo and at Thurstan College and graduated from the Vidyodaya University with a BA in Modern History. He also gained an LLB from the Open University, Sri Lanka. He joined the  Ceylon Police Force as a Probationary Assistant Superintendent of Police in 1971. In February 1991,  Fernando was promoted to Deputy Inspector General of Police (DIG).  He served as Inspector-General of Police from October 2004 to October 2006.

After retiring from the Police Service he served as Presidential Advisor to President Mahinda Rajapaksa.

References

|-

|-

Sri Lankan Inspectors General of Police
Alumni of the University of Ceylon
Alumni of St. Peter's College, Colombo
Alumni of the University of Sri Jayewardenepura